Short Heath railway station was a station built by the Wolverhampton and Walsall Railway in 1872, and was operated by the Midland Railway from 1876 onwards. It served the area of Short Heath, to the north east of Willenhall, although it was located well to the south of Short Heath itself.

The station closed in 1931 for passengers and for freight on 7 December 1964.

Station site today

The station site is now a small hill near Willenhall Fire Station with the trackbed to the north converted into a public footpath and the trackbed towards Willenhall was removed and is now a slope towards small industrial units.

References

Disused railway stations in Walsall
Railway stations in Great Britain opened in 1872
Railway stations in Great Britain closed in 1931
Former Midland Railway stations